Football Club Pro Vercelli 1892, commonly referred to as Pro Vercelli, is an Italian football club based in Vercelli, Piedmont. The club is mostly renowned as one of the most successful teams in the early football era of Italy, with seven national titles (all won between 1908 and 1922). They currently play in Serie C, the third tier of Italian football.

History

Early league successes and decline

The origins of football in Vercelli go back to 1892 when it was founded as Società Ginnastica Pro Vercelli (Pro Vercelli Gymnastics Society), and 1903 with its Football Division.

The first official match for the football division of S.G. Pro Vercelli took place on 3 August 1903 against the Forza e Costanza.

The club won seven Italian Football Championships from 1908 to 1922: 1908, 1909, 1910–11, 1911–12, 1912–13, 1920–21, and 1921–22.

The introduction of professionalism in Italian football, and the rise of teams from larger industrial and business cities such as Milan and Turin, led Pro Vercelli to a slow but continuous decline. They played Serie A for their last time to date in 1934–35, and went ultimately relegated also from the 1947–48 Serie B, starting a long period out of the two top divisions of Italian football, even being relegated to Italy's amateur league, Serie D, in multiple times. They regained professional status for good after winning promotion and the Scudetto Dilettanti in the season 1993–94.

Bankruptcy and the new Pro Vercelli

In the early 2000s, Pro Vercelli also had to challenge crosstown rivalry from a new team, A.S. Pro Belvedere Vercelli (with the colours yellow and green), founded in the summer of 2006 as a merger between A.S. Trino Calcio (based in Trino, Piedmont), who played in Serie D and minor league team P.G.S. Pro Belvedere, founded in 1912.

In the 2006–07 Serie D, the team finished 9th in Girone A. A year later, in the Serie D 2007–08 season, the team finished 3rd in the same division, qualifying for the Serie D play-offs. It won its way to the group stage of the tournament, but failed qualify as one of the top 5 teams of the play-offs, all of which were later promoted to Lega Pro Seconda Divisione.

In the 2008–09 Serie D, Pro Belvedere finished first in Girone B, winning direct promotion to Lega Pro Seconda Divisione. Their debut season into professional football also featured, for the first time in the club's history, a crosstown derby with Pro Vercelli, but was not particularly successful, with the team lying in second-last place for most of the time in the 2009–10 Lega Pro Seconda Divisione, and promotion winning coach Luca Prina being replaced by the more experienced Gianfranco Motta.

Pro Belvedere were relegated after only one season but re-admitted to fill a number of vacancies in the league; at the same time, due to large debts, Pro Vercelli was not allowed to participate in the 2010–11 Lega Pro Seconda Divisione and so folded. In order to keep the old Pro Vercelli alive, Pro Belvedere changed its name to U.S. Vercelli Calcio and weeks later acquired honours and trademarks from the old Pro Vercelli, being thus allowed to switch its denomination to the current one, as well as to maintain the historical names and colours of the original team.

In the season 2010–11 the team played in Lega Pro Seconda Divisione ranking 3rd and was eliminated from Pro Patria in the semifinal of the play-off, but on 4 August 2011 it was later admitted to Lega Pro Prima Divisione to fill vacancies.

New successes: back to Serie B after 64 years
In the season 2011–12 of Lega Pro Prima Divisione the club was promoted to Serie B after 64 years, beating Carpi 3–1 in the final return of the play-off after the 0–0 of the first round.

The club had a very unsuccessful return to Serie B, finishing 21st of 22 teams and with a goal difference −30, the worst in the league. Their placing in the league meant that they were relegated to Lega Pro Prima Divisione.

In 2013–14 season, Girone A of Lega Pro 1, Pro Vercelli missed out on an immediate automatic promotion back to Serie B by a single point, finishing second in the league to Virtus Entella and eight points above third placed Südtirol. Striker Ettore Marchi starred throughout the season, scoring 15 goals. In the promotion play-offs, Pro Vercelli eliminated FeralpiSalò, Savona and ultimately defeated Südtirol in the final, thus returning to Serie B after only one season away. Pro Vercelli finished 16th in Serie B in the 2014–15 season and 17th in the 2015–16 season. They were again relegated to Serie C after the 2017–18 season. On 11 July 2019, former Italian international striker Alberto Gilardino took the job as head coach.

Colors and badge
The historical color of the shirts of Pro Vercelli is white.

Honours
Serie A
Winners (7): 1908, 1909, 1910–11, 1911–12, 1912–13, 1920–21, 1921–22
Seconda Categoria
Winners (1): 1907
Serie D
Winners (4): 1956–57, 1970–71, 1983–84, 1993–94
Scudetto Dilettanti:
Winners (1): 1993–94

International
Tournoi de Pentecôte du Club Français
Winners (1): 1927

Players

Current squad

Out on loan

Managers
 Guido Ara (1919–26)
 József Nagy (1928–32)
 Guido Ara (1932–34)
 Pietro Leone (1935)
 Antonio Montico (1976–77)
 Giuliano Zoratti (1986–90)
 Bruno Baveni (1995–96)
 Agatino Cuttone (1999–2000)
 Renzo Gobbo (2002–03)
 Nello Santin (2003–04)
 Roberto Galia (2007)
 Gianluca Gaudenzi (2007–08)
 Giancarlo Camolese (2012–13)
 Cristiano Scazzola (2013–15)
 Claudio Foscarini (2015–16)
 Moreno Longo (2016–17)
 Gianluca Grassadonia (2017–18)
 Gianluca Atzori (2018)
 Gianluca Grassadonia (2018)
 Vito Grieco (2018–2019)
 Alberto Gilardino (2019–2020)
 Francesco Modesto (2020-)

Bibliography

See also
 Dynasties in Italian football

References

External links
 
 Unofficial website

 
Association football clubs established in 1892
Football clubs in Italy
Football clubs in Piedmont and Aosta Valley
Italian football First Division clubs
Serie C clubs
Serie A clubs
Serie A winning clubs
1892 establishments in Italy